Sam Weiss may refer to:
 Sam Weiss (born 1926), American founder of SAM Records
 Sam Weiss (Fringe), a Fringe character